Woroud Sawalha from Asira ash-Shamaliya is a Palestinian Olympic athlete. She is one of two runners, along with Bahaa Al Farra, among the five athletes who represented Palestine in the 2012 Olympics. She competed in the women's 800m, placing last in her heat. She was also the flag bearer at the closing ceremony.

Due to Palestine's lack of training facilities, she and al-Farra often travelled to Qatar, Egypt, and Jordan to train for the Olympics.

References

1991 births
Living people
Olympic athletes of Palestine
Athletes (track and field) at the 2012 Summer Olympics
Palestinian Muslims
Palestinian female middle-distance runners
People from Asira ash-Shamaliya